The 1991 Hemsworth by-election was a parliamentary by-election held in England on 7 November 1991 for the House of Commons constituency of Hemsworth in West Yorkshire.  The seat had become vacant upon the death on 14 September of the Labour Member of Parliament George Buckley, who had held the seat since the 1987 general election.

The Labour candidate, Derek Enright, held the seat for his party.

Results

Previous results

See also
1934 Hemsworth by-election
1946 Hemsworth by-election
1996 Hemsworth by-election
List of United Kingdom by-elections

References

External links
Campaign literature from the by-election

1991 in England
1991 elections in the United Kingdom
By-elections to the Parliament of the United Kingdom in West Yorkshire constituencies
Elections in Wakefield
1990s in West Yorkshire
Hemsworth